This article details the Leeds Rhinos's rugby league football club's 2020 season.

2020 Squad

Table

Fixtures and Results

Challenge Cup

Regular season

2020 Transfers
 
Gains

 
Losses

Player statistics

Updated to matches played on 5 March 2020

References

External links
Official Club site
Principal fan site and forum
Super League Site
Leeds Rhinos Dedicated section on RugbyLeague.com
Leeds Rhinos History

Leeds Rhinos seasons
2020 in English rugby league
Super League XXV by club
Rugby